= Superannuated =

The adjective superannuated may refer to

- archaic, or old-fashioned
- related to a superannuation (pension), as used particularly in Great Britain, Australia, and New Zealand
- in the military, disqualified for active duty due to age
- someone older than the typical member of a particular social group
